Lake Lorraine is a census-designated place (CDP) in Okaloosa County, Florida, United States. The population was 7,106 at the 2000 census. It is part of the Fort Walton Beach–Crestview–Destin Metropolitan Statistical Area. It carries a Shalimar postal address and zip code. Lake Lorraine was originally a fresh-water body, but at some point in the 1990s the narrow sandbar that separated it from the Choctawhatchee Bay was breached and the former drainage channel to the tip of Black's Point became blocked by silt.

The residential neighborhood originally developed along circumferential Country Club Road, surrounding a golf course, in the 1970s. The recession of 1976 left a number of properties in the interior of the golf course U in an unfinished and abandoned state. These parcels were later reconstructed. Further growth took place in the 1990s and 2000s, when the formerly wooded Black's Point area was developed with streets bearing the names of famous golfers. A "backdoor" gate onto Eglin Air Force Base, adjacent to base housing, accessed by Davis Court off of the northeast corner of Country Club Road, was closed amidst tightened base security and concerns about traffic routing through residential neighborhoods in the mid-1970s.

During World War II, adjacent Eglin Field anchored a battleship-size target float in the Choctawhatchee Bay, just south of Black's Point, the southernmost point of the Lake Lorraine area, an area designated during the war as Eglin water range 60.

Geography
Lake Lorraine is located at  (30.441648, -86.570152).

Demographics

As of the census of 2000, there were 7,106 people, 2,937 households, and 2,029 families residing in the CDP. The racial makeup of the CDP was 82.70% White, 8.53% African American, 0.41% Native American, 3.22% Asian, 0.15% Pacific Islander, 1.86% from other races, and 3.12% from two or more races. Hispanic or Latino of any race were 5.39% of the population.

There were 2,937 households, out of which 30.1% had children under the age of 18 living with them, 54.9% were married couples living together, 10.8% had a female householder with no husband present, and 30.9% were non-families. 23.8% of all households were made up of individuals, and 6.2% had someone living alone who was 65 years of age or older.  The average household size was 2.42 and the average family size was 2.85.

In the CDP, the population was spread out, with 23.5% under the age of 18, 8.3% from 18 to 24, 28.9% from 25 to 44, 27.2% from 45 to 64, and 12.2% who were 65 years of age or older.  The median age was 38 years. For every 100 females, there were 97.3 males.  For every 100 females age 18 and over, there were 96.5 males.

The median income for a household in the CDP was $47,437, and the median income for a family was $54,613. Males had a median income of $32,483 versus $21,688 for females. The per capita income for the CDP was $22,695.  About 4.7% of families and 6.5% of the population were below the poverty line, including 9.1% of those under age 18 and 6.1% of those age 65 or over.

Notable person
General Chuck Horner - Air commander during Desert Storm

References

Census-designated places in Okaloosa County, Florida
Populated places established in the 1970s
Census-designated places in Florida
Populated places on the Intracoastal Waterway in Florida